Xavier College, Madagascar is a private Catholic secondary school, located in Fianarantsoa, Madagascar, an island nation off the east coast of Africa. The school was opened by the Jesuits in 1952.

See also

 Catholic Church in Madagascar
 Education in Madagascar
 List of Jesuit schools

References  

Jesuit secondary schools in Madagascar
Buildings and structures in Fianarantsoa
Educational institutions established in 1952
1952 establishments in Madagascar
20th-century architecture in Madagascar